PC Arcade is a collection of ten text-mode action games for the IBM PC published by the Arlington, Texas-based Friendlysoft in 1983.

Contents
The games included in PC Arcade are ASCII Man, Eagle Lander, Star Fighter TX-16, Shooter, Brick Breaker, Gorilla Gorilla, Robot War, Bug Blaster, Hopper, and PC Derby. Most of the games are clones of arcade games (e.g., ASCII Man is Pac-Man).

Reception
Stefan Jones reviewed PC Arcade in Space Gamer No. 66. Jones commented that "I highly recommend PC Arcade to PC users who want to try arcade games but don't care about superb graphics or absolute fidelity to the classics these games emulate. Hard-core arcadists (arcadites? Arcaders?) may be disappointed, though."

FriendlySoft claimed, in a 1983 PC Magazine ad, that "the first two PC ARCADE production runs sold out before they shipped."

Reviews
PC Magazine

References

External links
PC Arcade at MobyGames

1983 video games
Video game compilations
Video game clones
Video games developed in the United States